I Nyoman Sudarma (born 20 September 1968) is an Indonesian weightlifter. He competed at the 1988 Summer Olympics and the 1992 Summer Olympics.

References

1968 births
Living people
Indonesian male weightlifters
Olympic weightlifters of Indonesia
Weightlifters at the 1988 Summer Olympics
Weightlifters at the 1992 Summer Olympics
Place of birth missing (living people)
20th-century Indonesian people